Ciudad Altamiro may refer to one of the following locations in Mexico:
 Ciudad Altamirano, Guerrero
 Ciudad Altamirano, Michoacán